Phanaeus amithaon is a species of dung beetle in the family Scarabaeidae.

References

Further reading

 
 
 
 

amithaon
Beetles described in 1875